Lessness or Lesnes may refer to:

 Lessness Heath, a district in the London Borough of Bexley
Little and Lesnes Hundred, an ancient land division in Kent, England; referred to as Lessness in some records
Lesnes Abbey, a ruined abbey, in Abbey Wood, southeast London, England
Lesnes Abbey Woods, an area of ancient woodland in southeast London, England located near, and named after, the ruined Lesnes Abbey
 Lessness (short story), a 1969 short story by Samuel Beckett